Haplopsecas is a genus of jumping spiders with a single described species, Haplopsecas annulipes. It is found in Venezuela.

References

  (2007): The world spider catalog, version 8.0. American Museum of Natural History.

Salticidae
Endemic fauna of Venezuela
Monotypic Salticidae genera
Spiders of South America